Caverns of Khafka refers to either of two early platform video games published by Cosmi. In both game versions the player takes control of a treasure hunter in search for the fabled treasure of Pharaoh Khafka. The first game was created by Robert T. Bonifacio and released in 1983 for the Atari 8-bit family. Subsequently, a different game with the same title and overall theme was created by Paul Norman and released for the Commodore 64 in 1984.

Atari 8-bit version (1983)

Gameplay

Caverns of Khafka sets the player in the shoes of a treasure hunter exploring the underground Egyptian tomb. The tomb's caverns are littered with treasure which the player must collect in order to move on to the next level. There are four levels and in each one the player must navigate moving platforms, ladders, acid baths and other obstacles. Later levels introduce killer bats, rolling boulders or darts flying through the caverns. 

The player starts the first level with five lives and must collect 40 pieces of treasure to proceed. For every 20 pieces of treasure an extra life is awarded and there is a short period of invincibility for every 10 pieces of treasure.

Development
After finishing his first game for Cosmi, Aztec Challenge, Robert T. Bonifacio was asked if he could do some games for some box art that had already been created that the company didn't want to waste. Caverns of Khafka was based on "some box art that looked like something from an Indiana Jones movie complete with the big boulder rolling after the guy."

Reception
Personal Computer Games in a 1984 review concluded: "The graphics and sound on Khafka aren't quite up to the standard of some platform games currently on the market [...] However, the game is very playable once you get the hang of using the joystick". In a 2009 retroactive review, The Video Game Critic gave it a 'hidden gem' rating and wrote: "Khafka is crazy fun despite some very sloppy collision detection".

Commodore 64 version (1984)

References

External links

1983 video games
Atari 8-bit family games
Commodore 64 games
Cosmi Corporation games
Platform games
Video games developed in the United States
Video games set in Egypt
Ariolasoft games
U.S. Gold games